Guns of the Trees is a 1962 American black-and-white film by Jonas Mekas. It follows two young couples – Barbara and Gregory (Frances Stillman and Adolfas Mekas) and Argus and Ben (Argus Spear Juillard and Ben Carruthers). The film features an original musical score by Lucia Dlugoszewski and also folk songs by Sara Wiley, Caither Wiley and Tom Sankey. It also features Allen Ginsberg reading his poetry. George Maciunas makes a short appearance in the film.

References

External links
 Guns of the Trees at the Film-Makers' Cooperative
 

1961 drama films
1961 films
Films directed by Jonas Mekas
Films set in New York (state)
Films shot in New York (state)
American black-and-white films
1960s English-language films